Kükenthaløya is an island between Barentsøya and Olav V Land, Svalbard. It is located south of the strait Heleysundet and north of Ormholet, at the inner part of Ginevra Bay. The island is named after German zoologist and Arctic explorer Willy Kükenthal.

References

Islands of Svalbard